Maboane is a village in Kweneng District of Botswana. It is located 60 km north of Jwaneng and the population was 813 in 2001 census.

References

Kweneng District
Villages in Botswana